Bost is a commune in the Allier department in central France. The town is part of the Vichy urban area and has a twelfth-century church, St-Pierre.

Population

See also
Communes of the Allier department

References

Communes of Allier
Allier communes articles needing translation from French Wikipedia